, known professionally as  is a prolific Japanese actor and former stuntman best known for his roles in the Super Sentai and Metal Heroes series, especially as Retsu Ichijouji/Gavan in the 1982 TV series Space Sheriff Gavan. He is the president of his own action/stunt troupe called "Luck JET" ("JET" being an acronym for "Jaunty Eventful Troupe").

Filmography

TV Drama
Android Kikaider (1972, Jiro's suit actor)
Kikaider 01 (1973, Jiro's suit actor)
Robot Detective (1973)
Symbol of Justice Condorman (1975)
Akumaizer 3 (1975, Suit actor)
Himitsu Sentai Gorenger (1975) - Akarenger suit actor
Choujin Bibyun (1976)
J.A.K.Q. Dengekitai (1977) - Hayato Kono (episode 3)
Message from Space: Galactic Wars (1978)
Battle Fever J (1979) - Shiro Akebono / Battle Kenya
Denshi Sentai Denjiman (1980) - Daigoro Oume / Denji Blue
Kage no Gundan IV  (1985) = Gamahachi
Space Sheriff Gavan (1982) - Retsu Ichijouji / Gavan
Space Sheriff Sharivan (1983) - Retsu Ichijouji / Gavan (episode 1-6, 13-24, 34, 48, 51)
Space Sheriff Shaider (1984) - Retsu Ichijouji / Gavan (episode 49)
Choujinki Metalder (1987) - (episodes 25-26)
Hissatsu Shigotonin V Fuunryūkohen (1987) (episode 13)
Sekai Ninja Sen Jiraiya (1988) - Yajiro (episode 27)
Kamen Rider Black RX (1989) - Masaru Kujo (episode 34)
Juukou B-Fighter (1995) - Haruka's Father (eps 1-2)
Ninpuu Sentai Hurricaneger (2002) - Shurikenger disguise (episode 45)
Juken Sentai Gekiranger (2007) - Dan Kenshi (episodes 40 and 42)
Kaizoku Sentai Gokaiger (2011) - Shiro Akebono (episode 44)

Films
Urakaidan (1965)
Gamera: The Giant Monster (1965) - Self-Defense Force Soldier B
The Guardman: Tokyo yôjimbô (1965)
Akai tenshi (1966)
Sister Street Fighter (1974) - Combatant #1
Akane iro no kûdô (1976)
Dasso yugi (1976)
Golgo 13: Assignment Kowloon (1977) - Karate Brother 1
J.A.K.Q. Dengekitai vs. Gorenger (1978, Suit actor)
Denshi Sentai Denziman Movie (1980) - Daigoro Oume / Denzi Blue
Legend of the Eight Samurai (1983) - Inukai Genpachi Nobufuchi 
Kotaro makari-toru! (1984) - Teruhiko Tenkouji
Space Cop Shaider: Pursuit! Shigi Shigi Abduction Plan (1984) - Retsu Ichijôji / Space Sheriff Gavan
Shogun's Samurai (1985) - Gamahachi
Kamen Rider ZO (1993) - Kuroda
Battle Royale II: Requiem (2003) - Maki's father
Kill Bill Volume 1 (2003) - Shiro, Bald Guy
Kill Bill: Volume 2 (2004) - Shiro, Bald Guy
Sekiryû no onna (2006)
Gokaiger Goseiger Super Sentai 199 Hero Great Battle (2011) - Daigoro Oume
Kaizoku Sentai Gokaiger vs. Space Sheriff Gavan: The Movie (2012) - Retsu Ichijouji / Gavan, Shiro Akebono / Battle Kenya, Daigoro Oume / Denzi Blue
Space Sheriff Gavan: The Movie (2012) - Retsu Ichijouji / Gavan
Super Hero Taisen Z (2013) - Commander Retsu Ichijouji/Gavan
Dragon Emperor (2016)
Space Squad: Gavan vs. Dekaranger (2017) - Retsu Ichijouji/Gavan
HE-LOW (2018)

Video games
The Space Sheriff Spirits (2006) - Retsu Ichijouji/Gavan (voice)

Stage
Tiger & Bunny the Live (2012) - "Hero Academy Teacher"

References

External links
Official Profile at Luck JET/Japan Action Enterprise 

1955 births
Living people
Japanese male actors
People from Matsuyama, Ehime
Actors from Ehime Prefecture